Follow That Dog was a British television comedy which aired during 1974. It was produced by Southern Television, and starred Norman Rossington, Patsy Rowlands, Anthony Dawes, Nigel Rhodes and Janet French. All six episodes are missing, believed lost.

References

External links
Follow That Dog on IMDb

1974 British television series debuts
1974 British television series endings
Lost television shows
English-language television shows
ITV sitcoms
1970s British comedy television series